Lithoxus pallidimaculatus is a species of armored catfish endemic to Suriname where it is found in stony rivulets of the Suriname River basin.  This species grows to a length of  SL.

References
 

Ancistrini
Fish of South America
Fish of Suriname
Endemic fauna of Suriname
Fish described in 1982